Pradip Kumar Banerjee  (23 June 1936 – 20 March 2020) was an Indian professional footballer who played as a striker for the India national football team. He also captained the national team and later on became the coach of the national team. He represented India in 45 official matches and scored 15 official goals for the country. He was one of the first recipients of Arjuna Award, when the awards were instituted in 1961. He was awarded the prestigious Padma Shri in 1990 and was named Indian Footballer of the 20th century by IFFHS. In 2004, he was awarded the FIFA Order of Merit, the highest honour awarded by FIFA.

Banerjee died on 20 March 2020 at 12:40 p.m. after suffering from age-related issues, having been on life support at a Kolkata hospital since 2 March. He also had an underlying history of Parkinson's disease, dementia and heart problems.

Early life 
Pradip Kumar Banerjee was born on 23 June 1936, in Jalpaiguri in Bengal Presidency (now West Bengal). He studied in Jalpaiguri Zilla School and completed his schooling from K.M.P.M. School in Jamshedpur.

Playing career 

At the age of 15, Banerjee represented Bihar in Santosh Trophy, playing in the right wing. He later represented Railways and Bengal in the same tournament. In 1953, he joined Jamshedpur FA and made his debut against Hindustan  Limited in IFA Shield. In 1954, he moved on to Kolkata and joined Aryan. Later he moved on to represent Eastern Railway, and played under coaching of Sushil Bhattacharya, who guided them winning CFL in 1958, DCM Trophy in 1957, Bordoloi Trophy in 1967. He scored 14 goals for his team in 1959 season of CFL.

He made his debut for the national team in the 1955 Quadrangular tournament in Dacca (presently Dhaka), East Pakistan (now capital of Bangladesh) at the age of 19.

He represented India in three Asian Games namely, the 1958 Asian Games in Tokyo, the 1962 Asian Games in Jakarta, where India clinched the gold medal in football and then the 1966 Asian Games in Bangkok. He was part of the national team that played at the 1956 Summer Olympics in Melbourne. In that tournament, they reached the semi-finals, before going down 1–4 to Yugoslavia, which is still considered India's greatest ever achievement in football. He captained India at the 1960 Summer Olympics in Rome, where he scored an equalizer against France in a 1–1 draw. He represented India thrice at the Merdeka Cup in Kuala Lumpur, where India won a silver medal in 1959 and 1964 and a bronze medal in 1965. In 1961 Merdeka Cup, he played under Sailen Manna.

Banerjee, known for having incredible partnership with Chuni Goswami and Tulsidas Balaram, is one of the "Indian football's holy trinity". Recurring injuries forced him to drop out of the national team and subsequently to his retirement in 1967.

International statistics 
FIFA "A" matches only

International goals 
FIFA A international matches are listed.

Managerial career 

As one of the finest coaches in the history of Indian football, Banerjee came to be known for his inspirational pep talk to players termed as "vocal tonic" before games. He managed India national team at the 1970 Asian Games in Bangkok, Thailand and led them clinching bronze medal. In that tournament, he had players like captain Syed Nayeemuddin, Sukalyan Ghosh Dastidar, Shyam Thapa, Mohammed Habib, Magan Singh. The next year in 1971, he gave India an international title, winning Pesta Sukan Cup in Singapore.

His first managerial stint came with East Bengal, joining the club as manager in 1972. Throughout Banerjee's managerial career, he would frequently return to manage East Bengal.He managed East Bengal when they trounced arch rival Mohun Bagan 5–0 in the 1975 IFA Shield final, the biggest ever margin in Kolkata derbies. He managed Mohun Bagan in the historic match against a star-studded New York Cosmos spearheaded by Pelé on 24 September 1977, in which both the teams shared honours as the match ended 2–2. Under his guidance, Mohun Bagan's performance against the American club featuring Pelé, Carlos Alberto Torres and Giorgio Chinaglia, earned popularity worldwide.

In 1976, Banerjee joined Mohun Bagan, guiding the club to a historic feat, winning the IFA Shield, Rovers Cup and Durand Cup respectively to achieve their first-ever triple-crown triumph in one season. He became the national coach in 1972, starting with the qualifying matches of the 1972 Munich Olympics. He went on to coach the Indian Football Team till 1986.

At the 1982 Asian Games held in New Delhi, Banerjee managed India national team and took Syed Shahid Hakim as assistant manager. In 1983, he came back to East Bengal and managed a until 1984, and again in 1985. He gave them a Federation Cup, which let the club qualified for 1985–86 Asian Club Championship. As part of Central Asia Zone (tournament was named "Coca-Cola Cup"), his team defeated New Road Team of Nepal by 7–0 to start their campaign, where Biswajit Bhattacharya netted four goals, also beat Dhaka Abahani 1–0, Club Valencia 9–0. That 9–0 result against the Maldivian outfit is still the biggest margin of victory by an Indian team over any foreign opponents. Banerjee led the East Bengal to sixteen major trophies in four seasons which included four Calcutta League titles, four IFA Shield titles, three Rovers Cup titles, two DCM trophies, two Bordoloi Trophy wins and one Durand Cup title. His one of the finest Kolkata Derby games as head coach of East Bengal was the semi-final of 1997 Federation Cup, one of the most anticipated matches in Indian football history, in which he guided the club in front of 131,000+ spectators at the Vivekananda Yuba Bharati Krirangan, a 4–1 win against Amal Dutta's Mohun Bagan.

He joined the Tata Football Academy in Jamshedpur and served as its technical director from 1991 to 1997. Banerjee was awarded the player of the Millennium in 2005 by FIFA. He had also won the International Fair Play Award from the Olympic Committee, a feat that is yet to be repeated by any Indian footballer. In 1999, he again took up the post of the technical director of the Indian Football team. He also served as technical director of Mohammedan Sporting.

During his coaching days in Kolkata football, Banerjee had a fierce rivalry with Amal Dutta, witnessed during the days of Kolkata Derby.

Death 
Banerjee died on 20 March 2020 in a hospital in Kolkata. He was suffering from chest infection for a few weeks. He is survived by his two daughters Paula and Purna. His brother Prasun Banerjee is also a renowned footballer who captained India.

Honours

Player

India
Asian Games Gold Medal: 1962
AFC Asian Cup runners-up: 1964
Colombo Cup: 1955
Merdeka Tournament runner-up: 1959, 1964; third-place: 1965

Bengal
 Santosh Trophy: 1958–59

Eastern Railway
Calcutta Football League: 1958
DCM Trophy: 1957
Bordoloi Trophy: 1967

Railways
Santosh Trophy: 1961–62, 1966–67

Manager

India
Asian Games bronze medal: 1970
Pesta Sukan Cup (Singapore): 1971
South Asian Games Gold medal: 1985

East Bengal
IFA Shield: 1974, 1975
Federation Cup: 1980–81

Mohun Bagan
Federation Cup: 1978–79

Individual 
  Padma Shri in 1990
 Arjuna Award in 1961.
 Listed as Indian Footballer of 20th Century by IFFHS.
 FIFA Order of Merit (Centennial), highest honour by FIFA in 2004
 Banerjee is the only footballer from Asia who has been awarded the FAIR PLAY Award.
 Mohun Bagan Ratna: 2011
 Bharat Nirman Awards — Lifetime Achievement: 2011
 Football Players' Association of India Lifetime Achievement Award: 2013–14
 East Bengal "Coach of Coaches Award": 2019
 Banga Bibhushan: 2013

See also 

 Arjuna award recipients among Indian footballers
 List of National Sports Award recipients in Olympic sports
 List of India national football team captains
 List of India national football team managers
 India national football team at the Olympics
 Football at the Asian Games
 List of association football families

References

Bibliography 

 
 

Chattopadhyay, Hariprasad (2017). Mohun Bagan–East Bengal . Kolkata: Parul Prakashan.

External links
 
 Obituary: The incomparable P. K. of Indian football at Sportstar (archived on 5 December 2020)

1936 births
2020 deaths
India international footballers
Footballers from West Bengal
Footballers at the 1956 Summer Olympics
Footballers at the 1960 Summer Olympics
Olympic footballers of India
Recipients of the Arjuna Award
East Bengal Club managers
Recipients of the Padma Shri in sports
Asian Games medalists in football
Footballers at the 1958 Asian Games
Footballers at the 1962 Asian Games
Footballers at the 1966 Asian Games
1964 AFC Asian Cup players
Indian football managers
India national football team managers
Asian Games gold medalists for India
Association football forwards
Medalists at the 1962 Asian Games
Mohun Bagan AC managers
Aryan FC players
Calcutta Football League players